The University of Texas at Arlington (UTA) College of Engineering is a college of engineering at the University of Texas at Arlington in Arlington, Texas. The engineering program was established in 1959 when Arlington State College was officially given the status of a senior college. The college currently offers 11 baccalaureate, 14 master's, and nine doctoral degrees. The College of Engineering celebrated its 50th anniversary in 2009 and is the third largest engineering program in Texas.

History 

As Arlington State college was given the status of a senior college in 1959, five baccalaureate degrees were initially offered in aeronautical, civil, electrical, industrial, and mechanical engineering. The founding dean was Dr. Wendell H. Nedderman, who later served as president of the university beginning in 1972. The first college of engineering building (the Engineering Building, later renamed Woolf Hall after UTA President Jack Woolf), was constructed in 1960. By 1968, all five of the baccalaureate degree programs were accredited by the Engineering Council of Professional Development. Master's degree programs were initiated during the same time frame. The university's first doctoral program, a Ph.D. in Engineering, was started in 1969. In the mid 1980s, the College of Engineering added three new buildings: Nedderman Hall, the Aerodynamics Research Center, and the Automation & Robotics Research Institute (now known as the UT Arlington Research Institute, or UTARI). The original engineering building, Woolf Hall, was also remodeled.

As The University of Texas at Arlington continues in its effort to become a nationally recognized research university, the College of Engineering has seen rapid growth within the past decade. In 2001, a Nanotechnology Research & Teaching Facility opened. In 2008, the Optical Medical Imaging Lab facility and Civil Engineering Laboratory Building were completed.

The University of Texas at Arlington is the only institution in North Texas to offer degrees in architectural engineering and aerospace engineering.

The College of Engineering consistently ranks in the top 100 of the nation's engineering programs according to US News & World Report rankings.

Today, the College of Engineering has more than 7,000 students in seven departments (bioengineering, civil engineering, computer science & engineering, electrical engineering, industrial and manufacturing systems engineering, materials science and engineering, and mechanical and aerospace engineering). The Civil Engineering Department, ranked 33rd in the country, is one of the most productive and progressive academic units in the College of Engineering with enrollment is over 1600 students and strong support from local industry and alumni, demonstrated through the number of scholarships. The College of Engineering is the most comprehensive engineering program in North Texas.

Academic departments 
 Bioengineering
 Civil Engineering
 Computer Science & Engineering
 Electrical Engineering
 Industrial, Manufacturing, and Systems Engineering
 Materials Science and Engineering
 Mechanical and Aerospace Engineering

Deans of the College 

 1959 Wendell Nedderman
 1969 Andrew Sailis
 1981 John Rouse
 1987 John McElroy
 1996 J. Ronald Bailey
 2000 Bill Carroll
 2012 Jean Pierre Bardet
 2013 Khosrow Behbehani
 2016 Peter Crouch

Research centers 
UTA College of Engineering has numerous research centers, labs and groups. Additionally, it has affiliations with the UTA Research Institute (UTARI) and the Nanotechnology Research and Education Center.

References

External links
 

Engineering
Engineering schools and colleges in the United States
Engineering universities and colleges in Texas
Educational institutions established in 1959
1959 establishments in Texas